The FIA WTCC Race of Qatar was a round of the World Touring Car Championship held at the Losail International Circuit located in Lusail, Qatar.

The race made its debut in the World Touring Car Championship as the 12th round of the 2015 World Touring Car Championship season.

Winners

References

Qatar
Race of Qatar